Joseph Kossivi Ahiator (born  1956 in Aflao) is a Ghanaian artist, described as the most "sought-after India spirit temple painter in Bénin, Togo and Ghana". His work is in the possession of the Fowler Museum. He is noted for his print “The King of Mami Wata” (2005) and his Tchamba temple mural in Lomé.

References

Voodoo artists
Ghanaian artists
Living people
1956 births